is a Japanese manga series written and illustrated by Akihiro Ito. It has been serialized in Shogakukan's seinen manga magazine Monthly Sunday Gene-X since August 2000. The manga went on hiatus in June 2009, and following a nearly twelve-year hiatus, it resumed publication in May 2021.

Publication
Written and illustrated by Akihiro Ito, Wilderness started in Shogakukan's seinen manga magazine Monthly Sunday Gene-X on August 19, 2000. Following the 68th chapter, published on June 19, 2009, Ito put the manga on hiatus due to a sickness that rendered him unable to use his dominant right hand for drawing. After a nearly twelve-year hiatus, the manga resumed in the magazine on May 19, 2021. Shogakukan has collected its chapters into individual tankōbon volumes. The first volume was released on September 19, 2001. As of May 19, 2009, seven volumes have been released.

Volume list

Notes

References

External links
 

Action anime and manga
Seinen manga
Shogakukan manga